Seo Kyung-seok (born February 15, 1972), is a South Korean comedian and show host. He was a cast member of the variety show Real Men.

Education
 Graduated, Dongdaejeon High School
 Bachelor's Degree Program, Korea Military Academy (Dropped-Out)
 Bachelor of Arts in French Language, Seoul National University (Graduated)
 Master of Arts in Mass Communication, Chung-Ang University

Filmography

TV series

Radio

Awards and nominations

References

External links 
 
 Seo Kyung-seok - cafe.naver.com

1972 births
Living people
South Korean television presenters
South Korean radio presenters
South Korean comedians
Chung-Ang University alumni
Seoul National University alumni
South Korean Buddhists